A derringer is a type of pistol.

Derringer or Deringer may also refer to:

 Derringer (surname)
 Derringer (album), album by Rick Derringer
 Freshfields Bruckhaus Deringer, law firm
 John Derringer, Canadian radio personality
 Miss Derringer, American rock band
 Wing Derringer, plane
 Yancy Derringer, television series